Night of the Prowler is a 1962 British crime thriller film directed by Francis Searle and starring Patrick Holt, Colette Wilde and John Horsley.

It was shot at Shepperton Studios. The film's sets were designed by the art director George Provis. It was made as a second feature by Butcher's Film Service.

Cast
 Patrick Holt as Robert Langton 
 Colette Wilde as Marie Langton 
 Bill Nagy as Paul Conrad 
 John Horsley as Detective Inspector Cameron 
 Benny Lee as Benny 
 Marianne Stone as Mrs. Cross 
 Mark Singleton as Anders 
 John Dunbar as Davies 
 Robin Wentworth as Watts 
 Tony Wager as Detective Sergeant Baker 
 Jo Rowbottom as Elsie
 Mitzi Rogers as Jacky Reed

References

Bibliography
 Chibnall, Steve, and McFarlane, Brian. The British B Film. Palgrave MacMillan, 2009.

External links

1962 films
British crime thriller films
1960s crime thriller films
Films directed by Francis Searle
Films shot at Shepperton Studios
Butcher's Film Service films
1960s English-language films
1960s British films
Films set in London
Films shot in London